The October 2020 Arctic blast descended over the Western United States in late October, toppling records far and readings plummet to some  below average. The cold front brought record breaking snowfall and temperature extremes for October in the contiguous United States.

Affected areas
Virtually all of Western United States and Northern area was affected by the Arctic Blast. Temperatures plummeted well below average across many cities. Missoula set a record for its earliest zero-degree reading observed, hitting  on 26th October, Missoula also logged its eighth-biggest snowstorm on record, with a hefty  falling in just two days. The snow came sweeping down the Plains too, Wichita had accumulated  of snow by Monday, the heaviest snow it has experienced so early in a season.

See also 

 Cold wave
 February 2015 North American winter

References

Weather events in the United States